Pyle Rugby Football Club is a Welsh rugby union team based in Pyle, Wales, UK. The club is a member of the Welsh Rugby Union and is a feeder club for the Ospreys.

In the 1920s, Jack Bassett, later the Wales captain, would play for the club before moving to Penarth. In the 1970s Pyle won the Glamorgan County Silver Ball Trophy on two occasions.

Club honours
 1975-76 Glamorgan County Silver Ball Trophy - Winners
 1977-78 Glamorgan County Silver Ball Trophy - Winners
 2008-09 Glamorgan County Silver Ball Trophy - Semi-finalists
 2008-09 WRU Division Five South Central - Champions
2018-19  WRU Division 3 West Central A - Promoted

Notable former players
 Jack Bassett 15 caps
 Howell Davies 4 caps
 John Richardson 2 caps, coached Pyle

References

Welsh rugby union teams
Sport in Bridgend County Borough